The 1952 Toledo Rockets football team was an American football team that represented Toledo University in the Mid-American Conference (MAC) during the 1952 college football season. In their second season under head coach Clair Dunn, the Rockets compiled a 4–5 record (1–4 against MAC opponents), finished in a tie for sixth place in the MAC, and were outscored by their opponents by a combined total of 151 to 132.

The team's statistical leaders included Dave Andrzejewski with 582 passing yards and Bob Carson with 322 rushing yards and 428 receiving yards.

Schedule

References

Toledo
Toledo Rockets football seasons
Toledo Rockets football